Dafydd ap Hywel Grythor was a 16th century Welsh crwth player. He is known to have attended and performed at Caerwys Eisteddfod in May 1568.

References

16th-century Welsh musicians